Scammon Bay is a city in Kusilvak Census Area, Alaska, United States. At the 2010 census the population was 474, up from 465 in 2000.

Etymology 

It is named after Charles Melville Scammon Chief of Marine of the Western Union Telegraph Expedition by William Healey Dall in 1870. A local dish was also named after Scammon, which is a mixture of scrambled eggs and salmon, taking advantage of the abundance of the fish in the local waters. Popular folk etymology says that scammon is a portmanteau of "scrambled salmon", however that is incorrect as the name of the dish happened after the town was named.

Geography 

Demographics

Scammon Bay first appeared on the 1940 U.S. Census as an unincorporated village. It formally incorporated in 1967.

As of the census of 2000, there were 465 people, 96 households, and 84 families residing in the city. The racial makeup of the city was 1.94% White, 0.22% Black or African American, 96.13% Native American, 0.22% Pacific Islander, 0.22% from other races, and 1.29% from two or more races.  0.22% of the population were Hispanic or Latino of any race.

There were 96 households, out of which 66.7% had children under the age of 18 living with them, 56.3% were married couples living together, 19.8% had a female householder with no husband present, and 12.5% were non-families. 12.5% of all households were made up of individuals, and 1.0% had someone living alone who was 65 years of age or older.  The average household size was 4.84 and the average family size was 5.25.

In the city, the age distribution of the population shows 49.5% under the age of 18, 8.8% from 18 to 24, 24.5% from 25 to 44, 13.3% from 45 to 64, and 3.9% who were 65 years of age or older.  The median age was 18 years. For every 100 females, there were 94.6 males.  For every 100 females age 18 and over, there were 97.5 males.

The median income for a household in the city was $25,625, and the median income for a family was $25,938. Males had a median income of $36,875 versus $13,750 for females. The per capita income for the city was $7,719.  About 30.2% of families and 37.4% of the population were below the poverty line, including 49.0% of those under age 18 and none of those age 65 or over.

Education
K-12 students attend Scammon Bay School, operated by the Lower Yukon School District.

References

Cities in Alaska
Cities in Kusilvak Census Area, Alaska
Populated coastal places in Alaska on the Pacific Ocean